The Campus was a passenger train operated by Amtrak between Chicago and Champaign, Illinois. The Chicago-Champaign corridor already saw two trains daily: the Shawnee (Chicago-Carbondale) and the Panama Limited (Chicago-New Orleans). The Campus made a round-trip Friday and Sunday, serving the University of Illinois at Urbana–Champaign. A second train, the Illini, made a Friday trip. The Campus first appeared on the November 14, 1971, timetable, the first timetable Amtrak issued with its own numbers. Amtrak discontinued the Campus and Illini on March 5, 1972. Both trains had used Central Station, which Amtrak was abandoning; Amtrak judged that the additional 35–40 minutes necessary to serve Union Station made the schedule impractical. The Campus was the last passenger train to use Central Station.

References 

Former Amtrak routes
Passenger rail transportation in Illinois
Railway services introduced in 1971
Railway services discontinued in 1972